Burim Myftiu (born September 22, 1961) is an Albanian American contemporary photographer.

Early life
Myftiu was born in Prizren, Yugoslavia (in today's Kosovo).

Career 
Burim Myftiu holds a Master's Degree in Visual Arts. He initially studied Linguistics at the University of Prishtina. His passion for photography started in early 1980s. Later he specialized Commercial Photography in New York City. In 2003, he founded PACK (Photo Arts Collective of Kosovo). Myftiu is the founder and director the International Documentary and Short Film Festival - Dokufest. He is the curator of the International Photography Exhibition, "Gjon Mili Prize", at the National Art Gallery in Pristina, Kosovo.

Myftiu has participated in juries of film festivals and photography contests.  Additionally, he is a founder of Kosova Images Photo Agency, and has served as a regional liaison officer of the Fédération Internationale de l'Art Photographique (FIAP). He was appointed a Cultural Ambassador for European Commission in 2016 He is a member of the New Haven Arts Council in Connecticut.

"Missing", "Broken Dreams" and "Trance" are some of the long term projects he is working on. Presently, he teaches photography, doing editorial and curatorial work.

Myftiu resides and works in Connecticut, USA.

Exhibitions
2009: Balkandemokraci
2012: Bursa Photo Festival
2016 Beautiful Travelers II
2018: Trance

Documentaries
Discover Pristina with Burim Myftiu - Welcome to Pristina, as seen through the lens of photographer Burim Myftiu

References

External links 
Southeast Europe Artists 
BALKANDEMOKRACI Contemporary Art Exhibition

Gallery Kuenstlerhaus Bregenz, Germany

American people of Albanian descent
Yugoslav emigrants to the United States
New York Institute of Photography alumni
American art curators
Albanian photographers
American photographers
People from Prizren
Living people
1961 births